The Cyclo-cross Superprestige 2016–17 – also known as the Hansgrohe Superprestige for sponsorship reasons – was a season long cyclo-cross competition.

Calendar

Men's competition

Women's competition

Rankings

Men's Ranking (top-5)

Women's Ranking (top-5)

References

Cyclo-cross Superprestige
2016 in cyclo-cross
2017 in cyclo-cross